Thomas Jarrett House is a historic home located at 46 Louisiana Avenue in Asheville, Buncombe County, North Carolina. It was built in 1894, and is a two-story, frame I-house in the Queen Anne style.  It is sheathed in weatherboard and features a two-tiered, lavishly decorated portico.

It was listed on the National Register of Historic Places in 1994.

References

Houses on the National Register of Historic Places in North Carolina
Queen Anne architecture in North Carolina
Houses completed in 1894
Houses in Asheville, North Carolina
National Register of Historic Places in Buncombe County, North Carolina